Edmund Kowal (16 February 1931 – 22 April 1960) was a Polish footballer. He played in eight matches for the Poland national football team from 1953 to 1958.

References

External links
 

1931 births
1960 deaths
Polish footballers
Poland international footballers
Association football forwards
Sportspeople from Bytom
Wawel Kraków players
Legia Warsaw players
Górnik Zabrze players